The 2015 European Amateur Team Championship took place 7–11 July at Halmstad Golf Club, in Tylösand, Sweden. It was the 32nd men's golf European Amateur Team Championship.

Venue 

The tournament was played at the Halmstad Golf Club's North course in Tylösand, Halmstad Municipality, 9 kilometers west of  Halmstad city center in Halland County, Sweden.

The club was founded in 1930. Its first 18-hole course was constructed by Rafael Sundblom and approved in 1938. Another nine holes, constructed by Nils Sköld, was inaugurated in 1967. Together with the last nine holes of the old course, this formed the new course, called the North Course.

The club had previously hosted the 1985 European Amateur Team Championship and the 2007 Solheim Cup.

The championship course was set up with par 72.

Format 
Each team consisted of 6 players, playing two rounds of stroke-play over two days, counting the five best scores each day for each team.

The eight best teams formed flight A, in knock-out match-play over the next three days. The teams were seeded based on their positions after the stroke play. The first placed team was drawn to play the quarter final against the eight placed team, the second against the seventh, the third against the sixth and the fourth against the fifth. Teams were allowed to use six players during the team matches, selecting four of them in the two morning foursome games and five players in to the afternoon single games. Teams knocked out after the quarter finals played one foursome game and four single games in each of their remaining matches. Games all square at the 18th hole were declared halved, if the team match was already decided.

The eight teams placed 9–16 in the qualification stroke-play formed flight B, to play similar knock-out play, with one foursome game and four single games in each match, to decide their final positions.

Teams 
16 nation teams contested the event. Each team consisted of six players.

Players in the leading teams

Other participating teams

Winners 
Leader of the opening 36-hole competition was team Germany with an 11-under-par score of 709, five strokes ahead of team Ireland and a combined team from the Republic of Ireland and Northern Ireland. Host nation Sweden made it to the quarter finals with a one-stroke-margin on eighth place.

There was no official award for the lowest individual scores, but individual leaders were Robin Sciot-Siergrist, France, and Morten Toft Hansen, Denmark with a 5-under-par score of 139, one stroke ahead of Rowin Caron, the Netherlands.

Team Scotland won the gold medal, earning their seventh title, beating team Denmark in the final 4–2.  The last time the championship took place at Halmstad Golf Club, in 1985, Scotland also was the champions, winning their second title in the history of the event.

Host nation Sweden earned the bronze on third place, after beating eleven-times-champion England 4–3 in the bronze match.

A second division, named European Amateur Championship Division 2, took place 8–11 July 2015 at Postolowo Golf Club, Poland. The three best placed teams, Portugal, Austria and Norway, qualified for the 2016 European Amateur Team Championship.

Wales, Poland and the Czech Republic placed 14th, 15th and 16th in the first division and were moved to Division 2 for 2016.

Results 
Qualification round

Team standings

* Note: In the event of a tie the order was determined by thebest total of the two non-counting scores of the two rounds.

Individual leaders

Note: There was no official award for the lowest individual score.

Flight A

Bracket

Final games

* Note: Game declared halved, since team match already decided.

Flight B

Bracket

Final standings

Source:

See also 
 Eisenhower Trophy – biennial world amateur team golf championship for men organized by the International Golf Federation.
 European Ladies' Team Championship – European amateur team golf championship for women organised by the European Golf Association.

References

External links 
European Golf Association: Full results

European Amateur Team Championship
Golf tournaments in Sweden
European Amateur Team Championship
European Amateur Team Championship
European Amateur Team Championship